NAF Rockets is a Nigerian football club based in Abuja that is sponsored by the Nigerian Air Force. They play in the second-tier division in Nigerian football, the Nigeria National League.

The team is mixed with both civilian and military personnel on the roster. They were banished to Lafia for the last games of the 2009 season after a pitch invasion against Kwara United and then relegated after finishing last in the division. After two years in the third tier, they were promoted for the 2012 season

Current squad

External links
allAfrica.com: Nigeria: We're still in contention-NAF
AIRFORCE BOYS ON RAMPAGE IN ABUJA 
NAF Rockets banished to Lafia (Nigerian Compass)

Football clubs in Nigeria
Nigerian Air Force
Sport in Abuja
Sports clubs in Nigeria